Afghanistan is a linguistically diverse nation, with  upwards of 40 distinct languages. However, the Dari and Pashto are two of the most prominent languages in the country, and both have official status in Afghanistan. Dari, as a shared language between multiple ethnic groups in the country, has served as a historical Lingua Franca between different linguistic groups in the region and is the most widely understood language. Pashto is also widely spoken in the region, but the language is not multi-ethnic like Dari and is not as commonly spoken by non-Pashtuns. Dari and Pashto are also, in a linguistic sense, "relatives", as both are Iranian languages.

According to CIA World Factbook, Dari Persian is spoken by 78% (L1 + L2) and functions as the lingua franca, while Pashto is spoken by 35%, Uzbek 10%, English 5%, Turkmen 2%, Urdu 2%, Pashayi 1%, Nuristani 1%, Arabic 1%, and Balochi 1% (2021 est). Data represent the most widely spoken languages; shares sum to more than 100% because there is much bilingualism in the country and because respondents were allowed to select more than one language. The Turkic languages Uzbek and Turkmen, as well as Balochi, Pashayi, Nuristani, and Pamiri are the third official languages in areas where the majority speaks them.

Both Persian and Pashto are Indo-European languages from the Iranian languages sub-family. Other regional languages, such as Uzbek, Turkmen, Balochi, Pashayi and Nuristani, are spoken by minority groups across the country.

Minor languages include: Ashkunu, Kamkata-viri, Vasi-vari, Tregami and Kalasha-ala, Pamiri (Shughni, Munji, Ishkashimi and Wakhi), Brahui, Arabic, and Pashai and Kyrgyz, and Punjabi. Linguist Harald Haarmann believes that Afghanistan is home to more than 40 minor languages, with around 200 different dialects.

Overview 

The Persian or Dari language functions as the nation's lingua franca and is the native tongue of several of Afghanistan's ethnic groups including the Tajiks, Hazaras and Aimaqs. Pashto is the native tongue of the Pashtuns, the dominant ethnic group in Afghanistan. Due to Afghanistan's multi-ethnic character, multilingualism is a common phenomenon.

The exact figures about the size and composition of the various ethnolinguistic groups are unavailable since no systematic census has been held in Afghanistan in decades. The table below displays the major languages spoken in Afghanistan per sample statistics:

A sizeable population in Afghanistan, especially in Kabul, can also speak and understand Hindustani due to the popularity and influence of Bollywood films and songs in the region.

Language policy 
The official languages of the country are Dari and Pashto, as established by the 1964 Constitution of Afghanistan. Dari is the most widely spoken language of Afghanistan's official languages and acts as a lingua franca for the country. In 1980, other regional languages were granted official status in the regions where they are the language of the majority. This policy was codified in the 2004 Afghan Constitution, which established Uzbek, Turkmen, Balochi, Pashayi, Nuristani and Pamiri as a third official language in areas where they are spoken by a majority of the population.

Language families 

Since Afghanistan is predominantly located on the Iranian plateau, the majority of spoken languages belong to the family of Iranic languages. Turkic languages are spoken sparsely at the northern intersection of the plateau with Central Asia. Similarly, Nuristani languages and Dravidian languages are spoken sparsely at some regions where the plateau intersects with the Indian subcontinent.

Endangered Languages 
Until 2004, Dari and Pashto were the only languages promoted by the government. Though policy has since changed, it has still harmed many minority languages of the country. The table below shows endangered languages spoken in Afghanistan that are recognized by UNESCO. UNESCO recognizes 23 endangered languages in Afghanistan, 12 of which are exclusively spoken in Afghanistan and one having gone extinct after UNESCO's survey.

See also 

 Afghan Turkmens
 Demographics of Afghanistan
 Ethnic groups in Afghanistan
 Turkic people in Afghanistan

References

Footnotes

Further reading 
 Language Policy and Language Conflict in Afghanistan and Its Neighbors: The Changing Politics of Language Choice

External links 
 Distribution of languages map from Columbia University
 Linguistic map of Afghanistan